The 2001 Pilot Pen Tennis was a women's tennis tournament played on outdoor hard courts. It was the 19th edition of the Pilot Pen Tennis and was part of the Tier II Series of the 2001 WTA Tour. It took place at the Cullman-Heyman Tennis Center in New Haven, United States, from August 19 through August 25, 2001. Third-seeded Venus Williams won the singles title, her third consecutive at the event, and earned $90,000 first-prize money as well as 200 ranking points.

Finals

Singles

  Venus Williams defeated  Lindsay Davenport 7–6(8–6), 6–4

Doubles

  Cara Black /  Elena Likhovtseva defeated  Jelena Dokić /  Nadia Petrova 6–0, 3–6, 6–2

References

External links
 ITF tournament edition details
 Tournament draws

Pilot Pen Tennis
2001
Pilot Pen Tennis
Pilot Pen
Pilot Pen Tennis
2001 Pilot Pen Tennis